Diuris brevissima is a species of orchid which is endemic to New South Wales. It has two folded leaves and up to nine light yellow flowers with reddish-brown markings. It is a poorly known species that has only been recorded in the Blue Mountains.

Description
The petals have a broad egg-shaped to almost circular blade on a dark coloured stalk. Flowering occurs in October.

Taxonomy and naming
In 1939, William Henry Nicholls published a description of Diuris brevissima in The Victorian Naturalist, relying on printed but unpublished colour drawings of Robert D. FitzGerald of a specimen collected at Lawson. However Nicholls did not include a Latin description and therefore did not comply with the rules of nomenclature. In 1942 Nicholls formally described the species in a later edition of The Victorian Naturalist. The specific epithet (brevissima) is a Latin word meaning "shortest".

Distribution and habitat
Diuris brevissima is a poorly known species from the Blue Mountains where it grows in forest. Although in his 1939 publication, Nicholls refers to collections of this orchid from Ararat in Victoria, D. brevissima does not occur in that state.

References

brevissima
Orchids of New South Wales
Flora of New South Wales
Plants described in 1942